Peeltown is an unincorporated community in Kaufman County, located in the U.S. state of Texas.

It is a small rural community of 120- 150 people, located off County Roads 3094 & 4072. Peeltown was named for landowner Monroe Peel, of the Peel family, who arrived from Mississippi and settled in the area in the 1860s.

Infrastructure

In 1910, a large  gin was constructed in the Peeltown community. By the 1930s, Peeltown had a church, school, the gin, and numerous homes and farms. However, by the second half of the twentieth century, the school was closed. Peeltown does not have a gas station or grocery store; however, the community has a golf course, The Indian Oaks Golf Course, and a tree farm.

The center of Peeltown is on the corner of County Road 3094 and County Road 4072. Peeltown's center consists of The Memorial Baptist Church and the Peeltown Cotton Gin. There are a number of abandoned buildings in central Peeltown, including The Little Peeltown Grocery Store and the Peeltown school. Peeltown School ceased to operate after being destroyed by fire. The school's playground, including a metal slide and merry-go-round, remain functional.

Peeltown Cemetery
The Peel Family Cemetery was established in 1876, following the death of J. T. Peel. The cemetery is no longer functional and is only accessible on foot, as the cemetery path crosses a large, deep creek bed. The Peel Family Cemetery, which is on the south bank of the creek, is approximately 3/4 acre in size and is completely fenced. The inaccessibility of the cemetery may be responsible for its preservation, although it is currently overgrown in brush, weeds and cactus.

References

Unincorporated communities in Kaufman County, Texas
Unincorporated communities in Texas